The Etched City is the first novel (and the only one published to date) of the Australian science-fiction writer K. J. Bishop. It was published for the first time by Prime Books in 2003 (cover art done by K. J. Bishop herself), then by Tor / Pan Macmillan (in 2004 and 2005) and by Bantam Spectra (in 2004).

Analysis

The Etched City is a fantasy about love, unexplainable magics, and exile.

The novel has a style often described as New Weird, similar to the works of China Miéville, set in a society with a vaguely Victorian technology level. We read about two old friends, Raule – a healer and Gwynn – a bounty hunter, running from their homeland of Copper Country, chased by the winning side of the civil war they fought in. They reach the city of Ashamoil to start a new life, but they face unexpected and surreal trials.

The first few chapters show the pair moving together through Copper Country, a region with a part-Wild West, part-Arabian feel.  They arrive and part ways in Ashamoil; a city which at first seems an alternate early 19th century city with a colonial twist. But, as the fantasy elements of the novel slowly show themselves as the story progresses we discover that it is a difficult city to pin down.  Raule finds work in a slum hospital staffed by nuns, spending her time attempting to understand why so many deformed babies are born in her ward, in between stitching up local teenagers participating in skilled territorial knife fights.  Gwynn is employed by a powerful criminal "family" dealing in slaves, along with his old friend from his homeland in the icy north.  When not running errands for the ruthless master of this syndicate, Gwynn pursues an otherworldy woman who used him as inspiration for an art piece.

The story covers a bizarre variety of themes; characters speak at length in poetic phrases and muse about religion, obsession, karma and death, while vicious street battles are fought, drug-unlocked dimensions are explored and personal vendettas are carried out.  Add to the mix meat sculptures that come alive, warped apothecaries selling psychedelic hallucinogens, and a cynical holy man with a dark and useless power and you only scratch the surface of K. J. Bishop's Etched City.

Publications
 2003 (February), publisher Prime Books, cover art by K. J. Bishop
 2004, publisher Tor / Pan Macmillan UK
 2004 (December), publisher Bantam Spectra, cover art by Paul You'll
 2005 (February), publisher Tor / Pan Macmillan UK

Reviews
 William Thompson (2003) in Interzone, #190 July–August 2003
 Faren Miller (2003) in The New York Review of Science Fiction, July 2003
 James Sallis (2003) in The Magazine of Fantasy & Science Fiction, August 2003
 Gahan Wilson (2003) in Realms of Fantasy, October 2003
 Greg Beatty (2003) in The New York Review of Science Fiction, December 2003
 Michael Moorcock (2004) in The Guardian, January 2004 
 Sue Thomason (2004) in Vector 235
 John C. Bunnell (2004) in Amazing Stories, December 2004
 Vector 241

Awards
 2003 - Nomination Aurealis Award, Fantasy Novel 
 2004 - Place 3 Locus Poll Award, Best First Novel 
 2004 - Nomination World Fantasy Award, Best Novel

References

External links

 Amazon.com page containing the cover and readers' opinions
 Author's official site

2003 science fiction novels
2003 novels
Australian science fiction novels